Noksong Boham ( – 1 December 2019) was an Indian politician from Arunachal Pradesh. He was a legislator of the Arunachal Pradesh Legislative Assembly and a state minister of Arunachal Pradesh Government.

Biography
Boham was elected as a member of the Arunachal Pradesh Legislative Assembly from Niausa Kanubari in 1978 as a Janata Party candidate. He was elected from this constituency in 1984 as an Indian National Congress candidate. He was elected as a legislator of the Arunachal Pradesh Legislative Assembly from Kanubari in 1990 and 1995 as an Indian National Congress candidate. He also served as the state minister for forest, industries, panchayat, IFCD, telecommunications, economics & statistics of Arunachal Pradesh Government.

Boham died on 1 December 2019 at the age of 71. He was survived by his wife, six daughters and one son.

References

1940s births
2019 deaths
Arunachal Pradesh MLAs 1978–1980
Arunachal Pradesh MLAs 1984–1990
Arunachal Pradesh MLAs 1990–1995
Arunachal Pradesh MLAs 1995–1999
Indian National Congress politicians from Arunachal Pradesh
People from Longding district
Naga people
Janata Party politicians
Deaths from cancer in India
State cabinet ministers of Arunachal Pradesh